Maʿrifa (Arabic: “interior knowledge”) is the mystical knowledge of God or the “higher realities” that is the ultimate goal of followers of Sufism. Sufi mystics came to maʿrifa by following a spiritual path that later Sufi thinkers categorized into a series of “stations” that were followed by another series of steps, the “states,” through which the Sufi would come to union with God. The acquisition of maʿrifa was not the result of learnedness but was a type of gnosis in which the mystic received illumination through the grace of God. The finest expressions of maʿrifa can be found in the poetry of the Sufis Jalāl al-Dīn al-Rūmī (1207–73) and Ibn al-ʿArabī (1165–1240). 

The term 'arif, "gnostic" has been used to designate advanced mystics who have attained the spiritual station of ma'rifa.

Maqām 
In one of the earliest accounts of the maqāmāt al-arba'īn ("forty stations") in Sufism, Sufi master Abu Said ibn Abi'l-Khayr lists ma'rifa as the 25th station:

Four Doors 
Marifat is one of the "Four Doors" of Sufism:
 Sharia: legal path.
 Tariqa: methodico‑esoteric path.
 Haqiqa: mystical truth/verity.
 Ma'rifa: mystical knowledge & awareness, mysticism.

While in Alevism Ma'rifa precedes Haqiqa for Haqiqa is the Fourth door in Alevism not the third door as in Sufism.

A metaphor to explain the meaning of ma'rifa involves pearl gathering. Shari'a is the boat; tariqa is represented by the pearl gatherer's rowing and diving; haqiqa is the pearl; and ma'rifa is the gift to see the true pearl perpetually.

The main motivation of Ma'rifa comes from a history of Moses and Khidr in Quran, where Khidr has some mysterious knowledge from the creator. An individual with the knowledge of Ma'rifa knows things which can not be taught, only the creator blesses that person with that kind of knowledge.

See also 
 Gnosis#Gnosticism
 Hikmah
 Hikmat al-Muta’aliyah
 Irfan

References

Bibliography 

 
 
 
 

Sufi philosophy
Islamic terminology
Alevism